The people of Cyprus are broadly divided into two main ethnic communities, Greek Cypriots and Turkish Cypriots, who share many cultural traits but maintain distinct identities based on ethnicity, religion, language, and close ties with Greece and Turkey respectively. Before the dispute started in 1964 the peoples of Cyprus (then 77.1% Greeks, 18.2% Turks, <5% other communities, primarily Armenians and Maronites) were dispersed over the entire island.

The Turkish invasion of Cyprus in 1974 de facto partitioned the island into two political areas: 99.5% of Greek Cypriots now live in the Republic of Cyprus while 98.7% of Turkish Cypriots live in Northern Cyprus (99.2% of other nationalities live in the Greek Cypriot area in the south). Greek is predominantly spoken in the South, where the majority are Greek Cypriots, and Turkish in the north, where the majority are Turkish Cypriots. English is widely used throughout the island, as a common language.

The total population of Cyprus as of the end of 2006 is slightly over 1 million, comprising 789,300 in the territory controlled by the government of the Republic of Cyprus and 294,406 in Northern Cyprus. The population of Northern Cyprus has increased following the immigration of 150,000–160,000 Turkish mainlanders, which the UN considers to have arrived illegally. On this basis, the Republic of Cyprus government does not include this group in the population statistics of the Republic of Cyprus Statistical Service.

Population 

838,897 in Republic of Cyprus controlled area (October 2011 census preliminary result)
294,906 in Northern Cyprus (2011 population census).
1,133,803 total population of Cyprus (sum of population in Government controlled area and Northern Cyprus, 2011 data)
Population by citizenship

Republic of Cyprus government controlled area:
1992 census: 95.8% Cypriot, 4.2% Non-Cypriot
2001 census: 90.6% Cypriot, 9.4% Non-Cypriot
2011 census: 78.6% Cypriot, 21.4% Non-Cypriot (preliminary)
Northern Cyprus:
2006 census (de facto population): 66.7% NC, 29.3% Turkey, 4.0% other

Vital statistics

Cyprus (1901–1990)

Historical data about main demographic indicators from 1901 to 1990, for the entire island:

1 The numbers of births and deaths 1901–1932 are estimates calculated from the birth and death rates.

Area under the effective control of the Republic of Cyprus

Historical data about main demographic indicators from 1990 to 2018, for the southern part of the island:

Life expectancy 

Source: UN World Population Prospects

Structure of the population

Historical population
Turkish Cypriots were the majority of the population registered for taxation between 1777 and 1800. However, it is likely that the Muslim population never exceeded 35-40 per cent of the total population of Cyprus. Rather, many Orthodox Christians registered as Muslims in order to reduce taxation from the government.

In the census from 1881 to 1960, all Muslims are counted as Turks, only Greek Orthodox are counted as Greeks. There were small populations of Greek-speaking Muslims and Turkish-speaking Greek Orthodox.

In total, between 1955 and 1973, 16,519 Turks and 71,036 Greeks emigrated from the country. Of the emigrated Turkish Cypriots in this period, only 290 went to Turkey. In the 2011 census, 208 people stated their ethnic origin as being Latin.

Fertility
In 2020, 39% of children born in Cyprus were to mothers of foreign origin, both from non-EU countries and from other EU member states.

Immigration

Large-scale demographic changes have been caused since 1964 by the movements of peoples across the island and the later influx of settlers from Turkey to Northern Cyprus. According to the 2011 Census there are 170,383 non-citizens living in Cyprus, of whom 106,270 are EU citizens and 64,113 are from third countries. The largest EU groups by nationality are Greeks (29,321), British (24,046), Romanians (23,706) and Bulgarians (18,536). The largest non-EU groups are Filipinos (9,413), Russians (8,164), Sri Lankans (7,269) and Vietnamese (7,028). There are an estimated 20–25,000 undocumented migrants from third countries also living in the Republic, though migrant rights groups dispute these figures. The demographic changes in society have led to some racist incidents,<ref>"Teen says beaten and mocked by police in racist incident"</ </ref> and the formation of the charity KISA in response.

The demographic character of Northern Cyprus changed after the Turkish invasion in 1974 and especially during the last 10–15 years. TRNC census carried out in April 2006 showed that out of a total population of 256,644 in Northern Cyprus, 132,635, or 52%, were Turkish Cypriots in the sense that they were born in Cyprus of at least one Cyprus-born parent (for 120,007 of these both parents were Cyprus-born). In addition, 43,062 so called TRNC citizens (17%) had at least one non-Cypriot Turkish-born parent, 2,334 so called TRNC citizens (1%) had parents born in other countries, 70,525 residents (27%) had Turkish citizenship, and 8,088 (3%) were citizens of other countries (mainly UK, Bulgaria, and Iran).

Based on these census data, it is estimated that 113,687 Northern Cyprus residents, or 44% of the population, are not Turkish Cypriots properly speaking, but are in fact "Turkish immigrants" or "Turkish settlers" from Anatolia. Alternative sources suggest that there are 146,122 Turkish settlers from Anatolia in Northern Cyprus (2007 figures) and that the Turkish Cypriots in Northern Cyprus are today outnumbered by the Turkish settlers, contrary to the picture presented by the 2006 so called TRNC census.

Almost one-third of the Turkish settlers in Northern Cyprus have been granted TRNC citizenship by the authorities of Northern Cyprus and have thus been naturalized. . Settlement in Northern Cyprus, especially if accompanied by naturalization, is in violation of article 49 of the Geneva Conventions Protocol of 1977, since the Turkish occupation has been declared illegal by the UN. The UN General Assembly have stated the settlement of Turkish mainlanders, "constitute[s] a form of colonialism and attempt to change illegally the demographic structure of Cyprus". The Republic of Cyprus considers these Turkish immigrants to be "illegal settlers" and does not include them in the population estimates for the entire island published by the Republic of Cyprus Statistical Service.

Emigration

Nationality group 

The national identities of the population of the area under the control of the Republic of Cyprus are:
98.8%: Cypriot Greek
1%: other, including Maronite, Armenian, Turkish Cypriot
0.2%: unspecified

Languages

 
Greek and Turkish are the official languages according to Article 3 of the Constitution of Cyprus. In Northern Cyprus, the official language is Turkish (Article 2 of the 1983 Constitution of Northern Cyprus). English is widely spoken on the island.

Religion

The Greek Cypriot community adheres to the Autocephalous Greek Orthodox Church of Cyprus and the Turkish Cypriot community adheres to Islam. The religious groups of Armenians, Maronites and Latins (about 9,000 people in total) opted, in accordance with the 1960 constitution, to belong to the Greek Cypriot community.

According to the 2001 census carried out in the Government controlled area, 98.2% of the population are Christians of various denominations. 94.8% of the population are Christian Orthodox, 0.9% Armenians and Maronites, 1.5% Roman Catholics ("Latins"), 1.0% Church of England, and 0.6% Muslims. The remaining 1.3% adhere to other religious denominations or did not state their religion. Cyprus is also the home of a Jewish community with a Synagogue in Larnaca.

Education

Cyprus has a well-developed system of primary and secondary education. The majority of Cypriots earn their higher education at Greek, British, or American universities, while there are also sizeable emigrant communities in the United Kingdom and Australia. Private colleges and state-supported universities have been developed by both the Turkish and Greek communities.

Demographic statistics
The following demographic statistics are from the CIA World Factbook, unless otherwise indicated.

The data in subsections Age structure through Divorce rate are for the area controlled by the Republic of Cyprus government only. The estimates are for 2007 from the Republic of Cyprus Statistical Abstract 2007 (pp. 63–88) unless indicated otherwise.

Age structure 

0–14 years: 17.47% or 137,900 ( 70,700 males/67,200 females)
15–64 years: 70.07% or 553,100 ( 274,300 males/278,800 females)
65 years and over: 12.46% or 98,300 ( 44,600 males/53,700 females)

Population growth rate 

1.4%

Net migration rate 
Total immigrants: 19,143
Total emigrants: 11,753
Net migration: +7,390
Net migration rate: 9.4 migrant(s)/1,000 population

Sex ratio 

At birth: 1.086 male(s)/female
Under 15 years: 1.05 male(s)/female
15–64 years: 0.98 male(s)/female
65 years and over: 0.83 male(s)/female
Total population: 0.99 male(s)/female

Marriage rates
Estimates for 2006
Number of marriages:
Marriages of residents of Cyprus: 5,252
Total marriages (including tourists): 12,617

Marriage rates:
Residents of Cyprus: 6.8/1,000 population
Total marriages (including tourists): 16.4/1,000 population

Mean age at marriage:
Groom 33.7
Bride 30.5

Divorce rates
Total Divorces: 2,000
Divorce Rate: 2.27/1,000 population

Nationality 
Noun: Cypriot(s)
Adjective: Cypriot

HIV/AIDS 
Adult prevalence rate: 0.1% (2003 est.)
People living with HIV/AIDS: fewer than 1,000 (1999 est.); 518 cases reported between 1986 and 2006 (58% Cypriots, 42% foreigners/visitors);
Deaths: 85 reported between 1986 and 2006.

References

 EU27 population projections 2008–2060, Eurostat Newsrelease 119/2008, 26 August 2008.

 
Society of Cyprus